Mycobacterium holsaticum is a species of the phylum Actinomycetota (Gram-positive bacteria with high guanine and cytosine content, one of the dominant phyla of all bacteria), belonging to the genus Mycobacterium.

Type strain
Strain 1406 = CCUG 46266 = DSM 44478 = JCM 12374

References

Richter et al. 2002. Mycobacterium holsaticum sp. nov. Int. J. Syst. Evol. Microbiol., 52, 1991–1996.

External links
Type strain of Mycobacterium holsaticum at BacDive -  the Bacterial Diversity Metadatabase

Acid-fast bacilli
holsaticum
Bacteria described in 2002